OpenPicus was an Italian hardware company launched in 2011 that designed and produced Internet of Things system on modules called Flyport. Flyport is open hardware and the openPicus framework and IDE are open software.
Flyport is a stand-alone system on module, no external processor is needed to create IoT applications. The company ceased operations in 2018.

History
OpenPicus was founded by Claudio Carnevali and Gabriele Allegria during 2011. The idea was to create a hardware and software open platform to speed up the development of professional IoT devices and services.

By the end of 2018, OpenPicus Wiki and all relative Open Hardware info disappeared from internet as founders of OpenPicus now promote the brand name IOmote converting their knowledge to real business. Some old info (wiki, tutorials, etc.) for OpenPicus boards can be recovered via Internet Archive Wayback Machine.

Product
Flyport is a smart and connected system on modules for the Internet of Things. Flyport is powered by a powerful and light open source framework (based on FreeRTOS) that manages the TCP/IP software stack, the user application and the integrated web server'.
Flyport is available in 3 pin compatible versions:
 FlyportPRO Wi-Fi 802.11g
 FlyportPRO GPRS quadband
 FlyportPRO Ethernet

Flyport system on module is based on Microchip Technology PIC24 low power processor. It is used to connect and control systems over Internet through an embedded customizable web server or the standard TCP/IP services. The integrated microcontroller runs the customer application, so no host processor is needed. The pinout is very flexible since it is customizable by software.
 
Flyport can connect with several cloud servers such as Evrthng, Xively, ThingSpeak and many more.

Licensing
Hardware: Schematics are released under CC-BY 3.0 
Software: Framework is released under LGPL 3.0

See also 
Free hardware

External links 

openPicus website (archived)
openPicus Wiki (archived)

References 

Single-board computers
Networking hardware
Internet of things companies
Home automation